is a Japanese fencer. He competed in the individual épée event at the 1992 Summer Olympics.

References

External links
 

1970 births
Living people
Japanese male épée fencers
Olympic fencers of Japan
Fencers at the 1992 Summer Olympics
People from Shimane Prefecture
Fencers at the 1994 Asian Games
Asian Games competitors for Japan
20th-century Japanese people
21st-century Japanese people